Lionel Grant Tufnell (27 October 1857 – 11 August 1930) was an officer of the British Royal Navy, where he reached the rank of rear admiral.

In 1911, while commandant of the Royal Naval Engineering College, he was chosen to head the British naval mission to Greece, where he was given the rank of vice admiral in the Royal Hellenic Navy and enjoyed sweeping powers over the ships and shore establishments of the Greek navy. The mission's work was interrupted with the outbreak of the First Balkan War in October 1912, but its efforts, particularly in matters of training and gunnery practice, were important in modernizing the Greek navy and preparing it for its successful campaigns in the Balkan Wars. Tufnell remained in Greece as an advisor to the Ministry of Naval Affairs until late 1913, when he returned to England. He was replaced by another British naval mission, which arrived in September 1913 and was headed by Rear Admiral Mark Kerr.

He later became a full Admiral on the retired list.

See also

References

Sources

External links 
Dreadnought Project

1857 births
1930 deaths
Hellenic Navy admirals
Royal Navy admirals of World War I
Place of birth missing
Place of death missing